Homeperseensuo is a swamp located in Hamina, Finland. The swamp is known for its strange name. "Homeperseensuo" translates to English as "Mold ass' swamp". Homeperseensuo is a part of the Hamina's reserve officer school practising areas. Homeperseensuo also has a peat production area.

Bogs of Finland
Swamps of Europe